Ruslan Makarov (born 19 January 1987, Tashkent region) is an Uzbekistani weightlifter. He competed at the 2012 Summer Olympics in the Men's 56 kg.

References

Uzbekistani male weightlifters
Living people
Olympic weightlifters of Uzbekistan
Weightlifters at the 2012 Summer Olympics
1987 births
People from Tashkent Region
20th-century Uzbekistani people
21st-century Uzbekistani people